The Secret World of Og is a 1983 animated film produced by Hanna-Barbera's Australian subsidiary (Hanna-Barbera Australia Pty. Ltd.) and based on the 1961 children's novel of the same name by Pierre Berton. It originally aired in three parts on ABC Weekend Special series on April 30, May 7 and 14, 1983.

Plot
A small green elfin creature visits a family of five young siblings (Penny, Pamela, Peter, Patsy and Pollywog) and their pets (Yukie, a dog and Earless, a cat) to help himself to their comic books. The children follow the creature through a secret downward passageway into a colorful underground realm of Og, a world of small green people who love games of make-believe. The inhabitants of this mushroom town mimic the characters of the children's favorite comic books. After the children and their pets survive several fantastic escapades, the Ogians enlist them to help save Og from the dreaded Snake People. But the children, unlike the Ogians, understand the difference between fantasy and reality, and when they expose the Snake People as mere comic book characters, the Ogians let them go free, all the wiser after their first visit to the Secret World of Og.

Voices
 Fred Travalena – Og, Old Man, Glub Villager
 Janet Waldo – Mother, Old Lady
 Noelle North – Penny
 Josh Rodine – Peter
 Marissa Mendanhall – Pamela
 Julie McWhirter-Dees – Pollywog, Green Lady, Woman
 Peter Cullen – Yukon Pete, Earless, Long John Silver
 Richard Beals – Floog, Flub, Blib, Little Green Man #2, Og Boy
 Hamilton Camp – Sheriff, Little Green Man #1, Butcher, Villager, Mushroom Harvester
 Dick Erdman – Pirate #1, Mayor, Man
 Brittany Wilson – Patsy
 Michael Rye – Worker, Cowboy #1, Green Deputy, Narrator
 Joe Medalis – Victim #2, Green Man, Glog, Doctor
 Andre Stojka – Victim #1, Elder Og, Og Father

Production credits
Written by: Mark Evanier
Based on the book by: Pierre Berton
Recording Director: Gordon Hunt
Casting: Ginny McSwain
Recorded at: B and B Sound by Ken Berger
Voices: Fred Travalena, Janet Waldo, Noelle North, Josh Rodine, Marissa Mendanhall, Julie McWhirter-Dees, Peter Cullen, Richard Beals, Hamilton Camp, Brittany Wilson, Dick Erdman, Michael Rye, Joe Medalis, Andre Stojka
Storyboard and Character Design: Steve Lumley
Timing: Chris Cuddington
Staging Design: Deane Taylor, Mike Trebert, Simon O'Leary, Peter Sheehan
Background Styling: Richard Zaloudek, Mike King-Prime
Background Artists: Jerry Liew, Rod Simpson
Animation Supervisors: Gerry Grabner, Di Rudder
Special Effects Animator: Henry Neville
Animators: Sue Beak, Dick Dunn, Greg Ingram, John McClenahan, Paul Maron, Mike Stapleton, Richard Slapscinski, Peter Eastmant, Di Rudder, Peter Gardiner, Cynthia Leech, Paul McAdam, Pam Lofts, Don McKinnon, Chris Hauge, Don Ezard
Assistant Animators: Paul Baker, Karen Barboutis, Christopher Green, Rodney Brunsdon, Denise Kirkham, Jim Wylie, Peter Jones, Lianne Hughes, James Baker, Kevin Peaty, David Law
Inbetweening Supervisor: Helen McAdam
Animation Checking: Ellen Bayley, Brodee Myers, Ian Hibble, Lyn McLean, Lauralei Wethy, Kim Marden
Colour Styling: Esther Ginat
Xerox: Joan Lawson, Sven Christoffeson
Paint Supervisor: Donene Bailey
Production Manager: Jack Pietruska
Co-ordinator: Roz Wiseman
Production Accountant: Wayne Dearing
Camera Department: Renée Robinson, Tanya Viskich, Tibor Papp, Mark Benvenuti, John Ilmenstein, Jan Cregan
Music by: Ian Mason
Recorded at: Music Farm Studios
Editing: Robert Ciaglia
Sound Effects: Angello Revello
Sound Mixing: Peter Fenton at United Sound Studios
Neg Matching: Chris Rowell Productions
Processed by: Atlab Australia
Producer: Doug Paterson
Associate Producer: Steve Lumley
Animation Director: Geoff Collins
Directed by: Steve Lumley
Produced by: Hanna-Barbera Australia Pty. Ltd.

See also
 List of works produced by Hanna-Barbera Productions
 ABC Weekend Special

Home media
The Secret World of Og was released on DVD in Region 1 by Visual Entertainment (VEI) in September 2011.

References

External links
 
 
 
 

1983 television specials
1980s American animated films
1980s American television specials
Animated television specials
American animated fantasy films
ABC Weekend Special
American Broadcasting Company television specials
Hanna-Barbera television specials
Hanna-Barbera animated films
Television shows based on children's books
Animated films about children